The 5th Congress of the Communist Party of Yugoslavia (Serbo-Croatian Latin: ,) was held from 21 to 28 July 1948, in the House of the Guard in Topčider, Belgrade. The Congress was attended by 2,344 delegates out of the 468,175 members of the Communist Party of Yugoslavia.

Background 
It was the first Congress of Yugoslav communists held after World War II, takeover of power in the country and establishment of the SFR Yugoslavia, but also the first major gathering of Yugoslav communists held since the 5th Territorial Conference, held in October 1940. Although 20 years had passed since the previous meeting, the 5th Congress was held in November 1928, and 8 years have passed since the 5th Territorial Conference, the main reason for conveying the Congress was the "Resolution of the Informbiro", adopted by Soviet–dominated Cominform on 28 June 1948 in Bucharest, Romania.

The Congress 
The main topic of the Congress was the "Resolution of the Informbiro" and supporting the Yugoslav leadership in resisting Cominform. The broadest publicity to the Congress was given by direct radio broadcasting and extensive press coverage. Reports to the Congress were submitted by Josip Broz Tito, Aleksandar Ranković, Milovan Đilas, Edvard Kardelj, Boris Kidrič, Moša Pijade and Blagoje Nešković.

The Congress gave political support to the Central Committee in "defending the independence" of Yugoslavia. The decision was made unanimously, by which the unity of the party was "confirmed". The Congress also adopted the "Resolution on the position of the Communist Party of Yugoslavia towards Cominform", which concluded that decisions of Cominform were inaccurate and unjust, but it was emphasized that the Central Committee should do everything to overcome the conflict.

At the end of the Congress, a new Central Committee consisting of 63 members, and a new Politburo consisting of 9 members, were elected. Josip Broz Tito was re-elected as the Secretary-General of the Communist Party of Yugoslavia.

See also 
 Tito–Stalin Split
 Informbiro period

Sources 
 Pregled Istorije Saveza komunista Jugoslavije. "Institut za izučavanje radničkog pokreta", Beograd 1963 godina.
 Hronologija Radničkog pokreta i SKJ 1919–1979. "Institut za savremenu istoriju" Beograd i "Narodna knjiga" Beograd, 1980. godina.
 Istorija Saveza komunista Jugoslavije. Istraživački centar "Komunist" Beograd, "Narodna knjiga" Beograd i "Rad" Beograd, 1985. godina.
 

1948
Government of Yugoslavia
Politics of Yugoslavia
Socialist Federal Republic of Yugoslavia
1948 in Yugoslavia
1948 in politics
1948 conferences
Congresses of communist parties